The Einstein–Brillouin–Keller method (EBK) is a semiclassical method (named after Albert Einstein, Léon Brillouin, and Joseph B. Keller) used to compute eigenvalues in quantum-mechanical systems.  EBK quantization is an improvement from Bohr-Sommerfeld quantization which did not consider the caustic phase jumps at classical turning points. This procedure is able to reproduce exactly the spectrum of the 3D harmonic oscillator, particle in a box, and even the relativistic fine structure of the hydrogen atom.

In 1976–1977, Michael Berry and M. Tabor derived an extension to Gutzwiller trace formula for the density of states of an integrable system starting from EBK quantization.

There have been a number of recent results on computational issues related to this topic, for example, the work of Eric J. Heller and Emmanuel David Tannenbaum using a partial differential equation gradient descent approach.

Procedure 

Examples

1D Harmonic oscillator 
The Hamiltonian of a simple harmonic oscillator is given by

where  is the linear momentum and  the position coordinate. The action variable is given by

where we have used that  is the energy and that the closed trajectory is 4 times the trajectory from 0 to the turning point .

The integral turns out to be 
,
Finally, that yields
,
which is the exact result for quantization of the quantum harmonic oscillator.

2D hydrogen atom 
The Hamiltonian for a non-relativistic electron (electric charge ) in a hydrogen atom is:

Take the action-angle coordinates:

For the radial coordinate :

where we are integrating between the two classical turning points  

Using EBK quantization  :

and by making  the spectrum of the 2D hydrogen atom  is recovered :

Note that for this case  almost coincides with the usual quantization of the angular momentum operator on the plane . For the 3D case, the EBK method for the total angular momentum is equivalent to the Langer correction.

See also

Hamilton–Jacobi equation
WKB approximation
Quantum chaos

References

Quantum mechanics